The Nova Southeastern Sharks baseball program represents Nova Southeastern University in the National Collegiate Athletic Association's NCAA Division II level. The Sharks have a very short history, having only a small number of years of play under their belt; even having only joined the NCAA as recently as 2003. However, the sharks have won the Division II championship in 2016, led by the coaching of Greg Brown. The sharks are also known for producing several MLB stars, such as J. D. Martinez of the Boston Red Sox, Miles Mikolas of the St. Louis Cardinals, and Mike Fiers of the Oakland Athletics. After the 2019 season, coach Greg Brown announced his resignation so that he could pursue an opportunity to join the Tampa Bay Rays as a minor league hitting coordinator. Laz Gutierrez, a former roving instructor for the Boston Red Sox was named as his successor.

References

 
1988 establishments in Florida
Baseball teams established in 1988